Rajendra Kishore Panda (born 1944) is an Indian Odia language poet and novelist. He has published 16 poetry collections. He was awarded the Gangadhar National Award in 2010, and the Sahitya Akademi Award in 1985. He received Kuvempu Rashtriya Puraskar for 2020.

Biography
He was born on 24 June 1944 in Natasha, a village Sambalpur district of Odisha state. He earned his Master of Arts degree from Allahabad University.

Works
His first collection of poems, Gaun Devata ( Minor Gods ), was published in 1947.

Books

Poetry collections
 Gouna Devata (1975)
 Anavatar O Anya Anya (1976)
 Ghunakshara (1977)
 Satadru Anek (1977)
 Nija Pain Nanabaya (1980)
 Choukathhare Chirakala (1981)
 Shailakalpa (1982)
 Anya (1988)
 Ishakhela (1999)
 Bahubreehi (1991)
 Collected Poems (2003)
 Drohavakya (2003)
 Dujanari (2003)
 Vairagi Bhramar (2003)
 Satyottara (2003)
 Bahwarambhe (2003)

Novel
 Chidabhas (1999)
" PYTHON"

Honours

In 2004, he was awarded a D.Lit. by Sambalpur University. He was awarded the Gangadhar National Award in 2010, and the Sahitya Akademi Award in 1985 for his book Shailakalpa.

See also
 List of Odia writers

References

1944 births
Living people
People from Sambalpur district
Recipients of the Sahitya Akademi Award in Odia
Writers from Odisha
Novelists from Odisha
Odia-language writers
Odia novelists
Recipients of the Gangadhar National Award